Silene nutans is a flowering plant in the genus Silene, most commonly known as Nottingham catchfly.

Description
Silene nutans is a diploid, mainly outcrossing, herbaceous, perennial plant.
The petals are white or pinkish and divided into two narrow lobes. Each flower remains open for three nights as a means of preventing self-fertilisation; the flower reveals one whorl of stamens on the first night, the second whorl of stamens on the second night, and the three styles on the third night.

Distribution
Silene nutans is widespread across Europe, from southern Spain and Italy north to the British Isles and Scandinavia, and is also found across large parts of Asia. It has been introduced to North America, where it is known as the Eurasian catchfly. It is found in the U.S. states of Michigan, Ohio, New York, Vermont and Maine.<ref>{{PLANTS | taxon = Silene nutans L. (Eurasian catchfly) | symbol = SINU2 | accessdate = January 12, 2010}}</ref>Silene nutans can sometimes be found in the very widespread MG1 (Arrhenatherum elatius grassland) community of the British National Vegetation Classification, and thus can be found where Arrhenatherum elatius (false oat grass) or Dactylis glomerata (cocksfoot) occur.

EcologySilene nutans is a steppe species across most of its range. At the periphery of its distribution, it has a patchy distribution in xeric habitats, such as open grasslands and on rock outcrops at forest margins, on both acidic and alkaline substrates (pH 3.8–8.0). In the far north of its range, S. nutans is characteristic of maritime cliffs.Silene nutans flowers during the night, and produces a strong floral scent to attract its pollinators, which are mostly night-flying moths. Chemical compounds in the scent include benzyl acetate and benzaldehyde.Silene nutans is the host plant for the leaf mining moth Coleophora galbulipennella.

Nottingham
The common name Nottingham catchfly commemorates the former occurrence of S. nutans'' on the walls of Nottingham Castle, and the species was chosen to represent the unitary authority of Nottingham as its county flower. Despite this association, Nottingham catchflies no longer occur in either the city of Nottingham or the wider county of Nottinghamshire.

Nottingham Castle Trust asked volunteers to grow the plant from seeds supplied to donate the successful plants back to the City to commemorate the re-opening of the renovation of Nottingham Castle.

References

External links
Root system sketch of Silene nutans, at Wageningen University and Research

nutans
Flora of Europe
Flora of Asia
Night-blooming plants
Plants described in 1753
Taxa named by Carl Linnaeus